Nannosuchus (meaning "dwarf crocodile")  is an extinct genus of goniopholidid mesoeucrocodylian from the Berriasian Middle Purbeck Formation of England that was originally named as a species of Goniopholis. The type species, N. gracilidens, is based on the holotype BMNH 48217, scattered fragmentary remains that include parts of the skull and various other postcranial elements named in 1879.

References

Early Cretaceous crocodylomorphs of Europe
Fossil taxa described in 1879
Prehistoric pseudosuchian genera